Ferrill is a surname. Notable people with the surname include:

Arther Ferrill (born 1938), American historian
London Ferrill (1789–1854), American Baptist minister

See also
Ferrell
Ferril
Merrill (surname)